The Sumatran spiny rat (Maxomys hylomyoides) is a species of rodent in the family Muridae.
It is found only in Indonesia.

References

Rats of Asia
Maxomys
Endemic fauna of Indonesia
Fauna of Sumatra
Rodents of Indonesia
Near threatened animals
Vulnerable fauna of Asia
Mammals described in 1916
Taxonomy articles created by Polbot